The 2014 FIA Hill Climb Masters was the first edition of FIA Hill Climb Masters, between the winners of hill climb national championships, and the winners of the FIA Hill Climb Competitions. The event was held between 11–12 October 2014 in Eschdorf, Luxembourg.

The overall win was taken by Frenchman Nicolas Schatz, at the wheel of his Category III Norma, as he recorded a time of 48.344 seconds for the  run. He finished almost a quarter of a second clear of Scott Moran, in his Gould, while the best of the Category II cars finished in third place with Eric Berguerand driving his Formula 3000 Lola. The top Category I driver was Yanick Bodson, recording a time of 60.834 seconds. In the Nations' Cup, countries were ranked in their consistency; three drivers per nation were considered, with the gaps between a driver's two runs counting towards the rankings. Italy's gap of 3.182 seconds was the smallest and therefore won the Cup, beating Switzerland's gap of 3.463 seconds, while third place went to Austria, with their gap of 4.952 seconds.

Results
Source:

Individual classification

Nations Cup

See also
 European Hill Climb Championship
 FIA International Hill Climb Cup
 Hillclimbing
 Mont Ventoux Hill Climb

References

External links
 Official Regulation
 website about Czech and European hill climbs
 EUROMONTAGNA.COM since 1993 – Most complete European Hill Climb Championship race results 1957-today by ing. Roman Krejčí

Hillclimbing series
Hill Climb Masters
FIA Hill Climb Masters